WJSP may refer to:

 WJSP-FM, a radio station (88.1 FM), licensed to serve Warm Springs, Georgia, United States
 WJSP-TV, a television station (channel 5, virtual 28), licensed to serve Columbus, Georgia